Alihassan Turabi better known as Ali Hassan, is an Indian actor best known for playing Aryan in the Star Plus show, Kahaani Ghar Ghar Kii. Apart from this, he has done many roles in various Indian television shows like Raja Ki Aayegi Baraat, Naaginn, Star One Horror Nights, Veer Shivaji, Mahabharat, C.I.D., SuperCops vs Supervillains, Savdhaan India, Sinhasan Battisi, Sapne Suhane Ladakpan Ke. He played Akhilesh Goenka in Star Plus's show Yeh Rishta Kya Kehlata Hai from 15 November 2016 to 17 December 2022.

Filmography

Television

References

External links

Living people
Indian male television actors
Male actors in Hindi television
Male actors from Mumbai
1972 births